XHABCJ-FM is a radio station on 95.9 FM in Guadalajara, Jalisco, Mexico.

History
XECCC-AM received its concession on November 25, 1980. It was owned by Sara Cabañas Rodríguez and joined the Promomedios family of "triple" callsign stations alongside XEAAA-AM 880 and XEBBB-AM 1040. XECCC cycled through many names and formats in its history.

In 2001, it carried the very short-lived Red W Interactiva talk network, which lasted three months. In 2003, it flipped to sports as Estadio 1440.

In 2005, XECCC was sold to OEM and changed its callsign to XEABCJ-AM. The concession transferred in 2010. As part of the sale, XEABCJ moved to XEAV's tower. After just one year with ABC Radio's talk programs, XEABCJ flipped to romantic as Corazón (2006-2008), tropical as La Estrella del Caribe (2008–14), grupera as La Feroz (2014) and lastly ABC Radio 1440 with romantic music.

In 2017, XEABCJ was authorized to migrate to FM as XHABCJ-FM. It began testing on the new frequency in May 2019.

In late June, the station began broadcasting test programming with a rock format. On July 1, 2019, the station formally launched as Rock 101, an extension of the Rock 101 online station created by Luis Gerardo Salas in 2016 (and patterned after the original Rock 101 in Mexico City) and the Rock 101 show already being distributed by ABC Radio. A year later, as required by the Federal Telecommunications Institute, the AM station signed off.

Rock 101 Guadalajara ended on November 30, 2021, and the station began primarily simulcasting XEAV-AM 580 "Canal 58", the other ABC station in Guadalajara, the next day.

References

Radio stations in Guadalajara
Radio stations established in 1980
1980 establishments in Mexico